Platostoma hispidum is a species of flowering plant in the mint family, Lamiaceae. It is found  in Kashmir to Nepal, Bhutan, Western Ghats, Indo-China,and Malaysia. It is commonly known as  hairy gomphrena.

Synonyms

Homotypic
Acrocephalus hispidus  Nicolson & Sivad.,  1980.

Heterotypic
Acrocephalus blumei
Acrocephalus capitatus 
Acrocephalus capitellatus 
Acrocephalus indicus , 
Acrocephalus indicus var. spicatus 
Acrocephalus scariosus 
Acrocephalus spicatus  
Lumnitzera capitata , 
Mentha cephalotes ,
Ocimum acrocephalum  
Ocimum capitatum 
Ocimum capitellatum 
Prunella indica

References

Lamiaceae
Plants described in 1997